Prionapteryx diaplecta is a moth in the family Crambidae. It was described by Edward Meyrick in 1936. It is found in Burundi and Kenya.

References

Ancylolomiini
Moths described in 1936
Moths of Africa